Andre Eugene Ewell (born January 21, 1988) is an American mixed martial artist. He competed in the Featherweight division of the Ultimate Fighting Championship (UFC). He also competed for Classic Entertainment and Sports (CES MMA) and is a former CES MMA Bantamweight Champion.

Background 
Ewell, who is a Riverside, California native, excelled in football and track and field at Arlington High School. He was offered a full scholarship to go to University of California, Los Angeles (UCLA) after his graduated from high school. However, due to his poor grades, he went to a community college instead. During his college year, inspired by Roy Jones Jr., he picked up boxing and wanted to pursue it as a career but his first few boxing matches results were disappointing.
During this time, his son, Eli, was born, and due to the falling out with his child's mother and was denied for custody of his son. Ewell transitioned to mixed martial arts, hoping he could find success in the sport and could prove to the court he has value and he could be the financial provider for his son.

Mixed martial arts career

Early career 
Without any amateur mixed martial arts fights, Ewell fought most of his early professional fights primarily in the Inland Empire area of Southern California. He competed for regional promotions Gladiator Challenge, King of the Cage (KOTC), Legacy Fighting Alliance and Classic Entertainment and Sports (CES MMA) promotions where he was the former CES MMA bantamweight champion. Ewell amassed a record of 13–4 prior signed by UFC.

Ultimate Fighting Championship 
In his promotional debut, Ewell faced Renan Barão on September 22, 2018 at UFC Fight Night 137.  At weigh-ins, Barão weighted five pounds over bantamweight non-title fight limit of 136 and he was fined 30 percent of his purse to Ewell. Ewell won the fight via split decision.

On December 29, 2018, Ewell faced Nathaniel Wood on December 29, 2018 at UFC 232. He lost the bout via submission in the third round.

Ewell faced Anderson dos Santos on June 22, 2019 at UFC Fight Night: Moicano vs. The Korean Zombie. He won the fight via unanimous decision.

Ewell faced Marlon Vera on October 12, 2019 at UFC Fight Night 161.  He lost the fight via technical knockout.

Ewell faced Jonathan Martinez on February 8, 2020 at UFC 247. He won the fight via split decision.

Ewell faced Irwin Rivera on September 19, 2020 at UFC Fight Night 178. He won the fight via split decision.

Ewell was scheduled to face Cody Stamann, replacing Merab Dvalishvili, on February 6, 2021 at UFC Fight Night 184.During fight week, Ewell tested positive for COVID and pulled from the bout.

Ewell was quickly rescheduled and faced Chris Gutiérrez on February 13, 2021 at UFC 258. He lost the fight via unanimous decision.

Ewell faced Julio Arce on July 24, 2021 at UFC on ESPN: Sandhagen vs. Dillashaw. He lost in the second round via technical knockout.

Ewell faced Charles Jourdain on December 18, 2021 at UFC Fight Night: Lewis vs. Daukaus. He lost the bout via unanimous decision.

On February 10, 2022, it was announced that Ewell was released by UFC.

Post UFC 
In his first bout after leaving the UFC, Ewell faced Drew Brokenshire in July 15, 2022 at Freedom Fight Night 2. He lost the bout via unanimous decision.

Ewell faced Brady Huang on August 20, 2022 at UNF 2. He won the bout via TKO stoppage in the first round.

Championships and accomplishments

Mixed martial arts
Classic Entertainment and Sports (CES MMA)
Classic Entertainment and Sports Bantamweight Champion (One time)

Personal life 
Ewell has a son named Eli Edward Ewell.

Mixed martial arts record 

|-
|Win
|align=center|18–10
|Brady Huang
|TKO (punches)
|UNF 2
|
|align=center|1
|align=center|1:52
|Commerce, California, United States
|
|-
|Loss
|align=center|17–10
|Drew Brokenshire
|Decision (unanimous)
|Freedom Fight Night 2
|
|align=center|3
|align=center|5:00
|Mesa, Arizona, United States
|
|-
|Loss
|align=center|17–9
|Charles Jourdain
|Decision (unanimous)
|UFC Fight Night: Lewis vs. Daukaus
|
|align=center|3
|align=center|5:00
|Las Vegas, Nevada, United States
|
|-
|Loss
|align=center|17–8
|Julio Arce
|TKO (punches)
|UFC on ESPN: Sandhagen vs. Dillashaw 
|
|align=center|2
|align=center|3:45
|Las Vegas, Nevada, United States
|
|-
|Loss
|align=center|17–7
|Chris Gutiérrez
|Decision (unanimous)
|UFC 258
|
|align=center|3
|align=center|5:00
|Las Vegas, Nevada, United States
|
|-
|Win
|align=center|17–6
|Irwin Rivera
|Decision (split)
|UFC Fight Night: Covington vs. Woodley
|
|align=center|3
|align=center|5:00
|Las Vegas, Nevada, United States
|
|-
|Win
|align=center|16–6
|Jonathan Martinez
|Decision (split)
|UFC 247 
|
|align=center|3
|align=center|5:00
|Houston, Texas, United States
|
|-
|Loss
|align=center|15–6
|Marlon Vera
|TKO (elbows and punches)
|UFC Fight Night: Joanna vs. Waterson 
|
|align=center|3
|align=center|3:17
|Tampa, Florida, United States
| 
|-
|Win
|align=center|15–5
|Anderson dos Santos
|Decision (unanimous)
|UFC Fight Night: Moicano vs. The Korean Zombie
|
|align=center|3
|align=center|5:00
|Greenville, South Carolina, United States
|
|-
|Loss
|align=center|14–5
|Nathaniel Wood
|Submission (rear-naked choke)
|UFC 232
|
|align=center|3
|align=center|4:12
|Inglewood, California, United States
|
|-
|Win
|align=center|14–4
|Renan Barão 
|Decision (split)
|UFC Fight Night: Santos vs. Anders 
|
|align=center|3
|align=center|5:00
|São Paulo, Brazil
|
|-
|Win
|align=center|13–4
|Dinis Paiva
|Submission (brabo choke)
|CES MMA 50
|
|align=center|3
|align=center|0:36
|Lincoln, Rhode Island, United States
|
|-
|Win
|align=center|12–4
|Trent Meaux
|KO (punch)
|LFA 36
|
|align=center|1
|align=center|1:41
|Cabazon, California, United States
|
|-
|Win
|align=center|11–4
|Gustavo Lopez
|KO (punch)
|KOTC: Energetic Pursuit
|
|align=center|1
|align=center|4:44
|Ontario, California, United States
|
|-
|Win
|align=center|10–4
|Hugo Flores
|Submission (guillotine choke)
|Gladiator Challenge: Season's Beatings
|
|align=center|1
|align=center|0:29
|Rancho Mirage, California, United States
|
|-
|Loss
|align=center|9–4
|Patchy Mix
|Submission (rear-naked choke)
|KOTC: Ultimate Mix
|
|align=center|1
|align=center|2:28
|Las Vegas, Nevada, United States
|
|-
|Win
|align=center|9–3
|Willie Gates
|Submission (rear-naked choke)
|KOTC: Never Quit
|
|align=center|3
|align=center|2:47
|Ontario, California, United States
|
|-
|Win
|align=center|8–3
|Chris Chavez
|Submission (choke)
|Gladiator Challenge: Summer Feud
|
|align=center|1
|align=center|0:27
|San Jacinto, California, United States
|
|-
|Win
|align=center|7–3
|Rick James
|Decision (unanimous)
|KOTC: Groundbreaking
|
|align=center|3
|align=center|5:00
|San Jacinto, California, United States
|
|-
|Win
|align=center|6–3
|Dominic Nichols
|TKO (punches)
|Gladiator Challenge: Absolute Beatdown
|
|align=center|1
|align=center|0:20
|San Jacinto, California, United States
|
|-
|Loss
|align=center|5–3
|Ryan Lilley
|Decision (split)
|Gladiator Challenge: Battle Cage
|
|align=center|3
|align=center|3:00
|Rancho Mirage, California, United States
|
|-
|Win
|align=center|5–2
|Jimmy Marquez
|TKO (punches)
|Gladiator Challenge: Season's Beatings
|
|align=center|1
|align=center|1:23
|San Jacinto, California, United States
|
|-
|Loss
|align=center|4–2
|Juan Beltran
|Submission (choke)
|Gladiator Challenge: Rampage
|
|align=center|3
|align=center|4:10
|Rancho Mirage, California, United States
|
|-
|Win
|align=center|4–1
|Mario Casares
|TKO (punches)
|ladiator Challenge: Wrecking Crew
|
|align=center|1
|align=center|0:42
|San Jacinto, California, United States
|
|-
|Loss
|align=center|3–1
|Jordan Winski
|Decision (unanimous)
|Gladiator Challenge: Young Gunz
|
|align=center|3
|align=center|3:00
|San Jacinto, California, United States
|
|-
|Win
|align=center|3–0
|Alfredo Perez
|TKO (punches)
|Gladiator Challenge: California State Championship Series
|
|align=center|2
|align=center|1:30
|San Jacinto, California, United States
|
|-
|Win
|align=center|2–0
|James Villas
|Decision (unanimous)
|Xplode Fight Series: Payback
|
|align=center|3
|align=center|5:00
|Valley Center, California, United States
|
|-
|Win
|align=center|1–0
|Miguelito Marti
|TKO (punches)
|Gladiator Challenge: Showdown
|
|align=center|1
|align=center|0:54
|Rancho Mirage, California, United States
|
|-

Professional boxing record

See also 
 List of male mixed martial artists

References

External links 

 
 

1988 births
Living people
American male mixed martial artists
Sportspeople from California
Mixed martial artists from California
Sportspeople from Riverside, California
Bantamweight mixed martial artists
Mixed martial artists utilizing boxing
Mixed martial artists utilizing taekwondo
Ultimate Fighting Championship male fighters
American male taekwondo practitioners